Cho-Liang Lin (Lin Cho-liang, born January 29, 1960), born in Hsinchu, Taiwan, is an American violinist who is renowned for his appearances as a soloist with major orchestras. Musical America named him its "Instrumentalist of the Year" in 2000. He founded the Taipei International Music Festival in 1997, the largest classical music festival in the history of Taiwan, performing to an indoor audience of over 53,000 and the Taipei Music Academy & Festival in 2019, a summer music festival.

Career
Cho-Liang Lin is a violinist whose career has spanned the globe for more than four decades. He began playing violin at the age of five. Recognizing that he needed to pursue his violin studies abroad, he made his way to Australia by himself when he was only 12 years old; he spent three years in Sydney. His commanding technique and precocious abilities then led him to Juilliard School, where he studied with the eminent Dorothy DeLay, teacher to several renowned soloists such as Itzhak Perlman, Gil Shaham, Midori Goto, et al. He made his public debut in New York City at the age of 19, playing Mozart's Violin Concerto No. 3 at Avery Fisher Hall.

Since his début at Lincoln Center's Mostly Mozart Festival at the age of nineteen, he has appeared with virtually every major orchestra in the world, including the Boston Symphony Orchestra, Cleveland Orchestra, Royal Concertgebouw Orchestra, London Symphony Orchestra, Philadelphia Orchestra and New York Philharmonic. He has over twenty recordings to his credit, ranging from the concertos of Mozart, Mendelssohn, Bruch, Sibelius, and Prokofiev, to Christopher Rouse and Tan Dun, as well as the chamber music of Schubert, Brahms, Tchaikovsky and Ravel. His recording partners include Yefim Bronfman, Yo-Yo Ma, Wynton Marsalis, Esa-Pekka Salonen, Leonard Slatkin, Michael Tilson Thomas, Isaac Stern and Helen Huang.  His recordings have been critically acclaimed, winning several Grammy nominations and The Gramophone's Record of the Year award.  He has been a member of the Juilliard School faculty since 1991, and, in 2006, he also started to teach at Rice University.  Lin served as the music director of La Jolla SummerFest in California from 2001 to 2018, and as the music director for Hong Kong International Chamber Music Festival since 2011.

An avid chamber musician, Lin appears at the Beijing Music Festival, as well as his perennial appearances performing at the Chamber Music Society of Lincoln Center, the Aspen Music Festival, and Santa Fe Chamber Music Festival. He is also featured in the film 4 as the principal violin of the Vivaldi's Autumn in one of the Four Quartets of the Four Seasons.

He plays the 1715 "Titian" Stradivarius.

References
Strings magazine, November/December 2001, No. 98.

External links
Official website of Cho-Liang Lin

1960 births
Living people
American musicians of Taiwanese descent
American people of Chinese descent
Hakka musicians
Juilliard School alumni
American male violinists
Members of Committee of 100
People from Hsinchu
Rice University faculty
Taiwanese people of Hakka descent
Taiwanese violinists
21st-century American violinists
Taiwanese expatriates in Australia
Taiwanese emigrants to the United States
21st-century American male musicians